Cape Day is a cape on the coast of Victoria Land  east of Mount Gauss. It was first charted by the British Antarctic Expedition, 1907–09, which named this cape after Bernard C. Day, an electrician and motor expert with the expedition.

References 

It's cape day on the 25 of August (an achal day like talk like a pirate day)

Headlands of Victoria Land
Scott Coast